Robert Gwyn Macfarlane  (26 June 1907 – 26 March 1987) was an English hematologist.

Life
Born in Worthing, Sussex, Gwyn Macfarlane left Cheltenham College in 1924 and a year later entered the Medical School of St Bartholomew's Hospital, London. In 1936 he married Hilary Carson MD and over the next 11 years had five children, a girl followed by four boys. Hilary practised as a GP, whilst always offering Gwyn great academic support. She died in 2010 aged 100 years. During Macfarlane's clinical years he was exposed to the sufferings of haemophiliacs and this subject became the core for his lifelong study into the processes of blood clotting.

He examined the venom of many different snakes and isolated the poison of  the Russell's viper to have the strongest blood coagulant powers, see video. He found that when a compound that included venom  at dilutions of 1 in 100,000 was applied to a wound, bleeding diminished. This medicine was later marketed as Stypven by Burroughs Welcome Ltd.. Stypven Time is now a standard measure for coagulation efficiency. This research was the basis for his London M.D. thesis for which he was awarded the University Gold Medal, in 1938.

In 1940 Macfarlane took the position of Clinical Pathologist at the Radcliffe Infirmary in Oxford. With a year as a Major in the Royal Army Medical Corps in 1944, where he was involved trying to treat the complications of gas gangrene on the war front, he continued to work in Oxford for the rest of his professional life. He led a team that included Rosemary Biggs and Ethel Bidwell, to investigate congenital coagulation defects, the treatment of bleeding disorders and to develop replacement therapies that enabled haemophiliacs to enjoy an almost normal life.

Perhaps his greatest contribution to modern medicine was his deciphering of the Enzyme cascade process of blood coagulation. Working in 1951 with Prof Alexander Stuart Douglas at the Blood Coagulation Research Unit in Oxford they jointly discovered a second strain of haemophilia, now known as Haemophilia B, but then known as Christmas disease after its first known sufferer, Stephen Christmas.

In 1956 he was elected to the fellowship of The Royal Society, in 1963 he was elected a Fellow of All Souls College and in 1965 was appointed Professor of Clinical Pathology at Oxford University. In 1966, he was awarded the Cameron Prize for Therapeutics of the University of Edinburgh.

Gwyn Macfarlane was a close associate of Howard Florey during the development of a process to extract penicillin from culture grown in the Dunn School of Medicine. Baron Florey went on to be President of the Royal Society and Macfarlane developed an enormous respect for the capabilities of a man, held by many to be one of the greatest scientists of the twentieth century. Macfarlane considered that the role Florey had played in the development of Penicillin had been overshadowed, so when he retired to Scotland in 1967 he commenced his first authoritative biography Howard Florey, The Making of a Great Scientist which was published in 1979. Later Macfarlane's second book Alexander Fleming, The Man and the Myth examined the life of the other great contributor to the age of anti-bacterial engineering. In later life Macfarlane felt that his close personal exposure to these developments left him as a conduit to modern science education, and his contributions both written and in BBC TV programs etc. will always be valuable.

In 1988, following Macfarlane's death in the previous year, The Macfarlane Trust (named after him) was established to help British haemophiliacs affected by the Tainted Blood Scandal.

Selected works
1934 (with B. Barnett) The haemostatic possibilities of snake venom. Lancet, ii,985

1938  The normal haemostatic mechanism and its failure in the haemorrhagic states. Thesis for Doctor of Medicine, University of London.

1953  (with R. Biggs) Human Blood Coagulation and its Disorders. Blackwell Scientific Publications, Oxford.

1961  (with A.H.T.Robb-Smith) (ed) Functions of the Blood. Academic Press, New York.

1964  An enzyme cascade in the blood clotting mechanism, and its function as a biochemical amplifier. Nature, Lond. 202,221

1979  Howard Florey, The Making of a Great Scientist, Oxford University Press

1984  Alexander Fleming, The Man and the Myth, Chatto and Windus,

References

 The Life and Achievements of Professor Robert Gwyn Macfarlane FRCS: Pioneer in the Care of Haemophiliacs, Alistair Robb-Smith. Royal Society of Medicine Services Ltd. 1993.
 A Review of the Scientific and Literary accomplishments of Professor R.G.Macfarlane CBE FRS. British Journal of Haematology 133(6);581-590 June 2006  Hougie, Cecil.

Interest factor
Video, Russell's Viper Venom, Blood clotting

1907 births
1987 deaths
People from Worthing
Fellows of the Royal Society
Commanders of the Order of the British Empire
People educated at Cheltenham College
Royal Army Medical Corps officers
Fellows of All Souls College, Oxford
Alumni of the Medical College of St Bartholomew's Hospital
20th-century British medical doctors
British haematologists